The women's cross-country competition at the 2002 Asian Games in Gijang County was held on 12 October at the Gijang Mountain Bike Race Stadium.

Schedule
All times are Korea Standard Time (UTC+09:00)

Results 
Legend
DNF — Did not finish
DNS — Did not start

References

External links 
Results

Mountain Women